= Lepir =

- Location in Iran
- Coordinates: 31°36′N 50°24′E
- Country: Iran
- Province: Chaharmahal and Bakhtiari province

Lepir is a town in north-eastern Iran, in Chaharmahal and Bakhtiari province at 31.6002778 N 50.4 E.
